Ugryumovo is a rural locality (a selo) in Yaganovskoye Rural Settlement, Cherepovetsky District, Vologda Oblast, Russia. The population was 32 as of 2002. There are 3 streets.

Geography 
Ugryumovo is located 41 km north of Cherepovets (the district's administrative centre) by road. Gorka is the nearest rural locality.

References 

Rural localities in Cherepovetsky District